Khardeh-ye Dehqan (also Romanized as Khardeh-ye Dehqān; also known as Khar Dehqān, Khūr Dehgān, Khūr Dehqān, Khūr-e Dehgān, and Tājābād) is a village in Derakhtengan Rural District, in the Central District of Kerman County, Kerman Province, Iran. At the 2006 census, its population was 36, in 20 families.

References 

Populated places in Kerman County